Ralph Waldo Emerson Barton (August 14, 1891 – May 19, 1931) was a popular American cartoonist and caricaturist of actors and other celebrities. His work was in heavy demand through the 1920s and has been considered to epitomize the era, but his personal life was troubled by mental illness. Barton was nearly forgotten soon after his suicide, shortly before his fortieth birthday.

Early life
Ralph Barton was the youngest of four children born to Abraham Pool and Catherine Josephine (Wigginton) Barton. His father was an attorney by profession, but around the time of Ralph's birth made a career change to publish journals on metaphysics. His mother, an accomplished portrait painter, ran an art studio. The young Barton showed his mother's aptitude for art, and by the time he was in his mid-teens he had already seen several of his cartoons and illustrations published in The Kansas City Star and the Kansas City Journal-Post. Buoyed by this success, in 1908 Ralph Barton dropped out of Kansas City's Central High School before graduation. He moved to Chicago in 1909 to attend the Art Institute of Chicago, but soon found he didn't "like Chicago or Chicago people and worst of all the art institute. I could learn twice as much at work," he confided in a letter to his mother. Returning to Kansas City within a matter of months, Barton married Marie Jennings, his first wife.

Career

While back in Kansas City Barton resumed his work for the Star and Journal-Post to support his wife and daughter, born in 1910. His first break, or national exposure, came in 1912 when Barton sold an illustration to the humor magazine Puck. Encouraged, the Bartons moved to New York City, where Ralph found steady work with Puck, McCall's and  other publications. His wife was not happy with life in the Big Apple, however, and returned to Kansas City within a few months. Barton rented studio space, which he shared with another famous Missouri artist, Thomas Hart Benton, and the two became fast friends. It was Benton, in fact, who served as the subject of Barton's first caricature.

In 1915, Puck magazine sent Barton to France to sketch scenes of World War I. It was then that Barton developed a great love of all things French, and throughout his life he would return to Paris to live for periods of time. In 1927, the French government awarded Barton the Legion of Honour

Barton's first caricature was of Thomas Hart Benton; his last, of Charlie Chaplin. In between he knew everyone and drew everyone in the social and cultural scene of New York. Some of his most famous works were group drawings, and perhaps the most noted was a stage curtain created for a 1922 revue, depicting an "audience" of 139 faces looking back at the real theater-goers. "The effect was electrifying, and the applause was great," said another caricaturist of the era, Aline Fruhauf.

Much of Ralph Barton's work from the mid-1920s onward was for The New Yorker magazine, which he joined as an advisory editor from its very beginning in 1924. He would also be a stockholder in the publication. Other prominent magazines of the era to feature his work were Collier's, Photoplay, Vanity Fair, Judge, and Harper's Bazaar. While many would be published unsigned, there was no mistaking Barton's unique style. Ralph Barton would illustrate one of the 1920s most popular books, Gentlemen Prefer Blondes. With the urging of friend Charlie Chaplin, Barton also made one movie, Camille. The short film featured such notables as Paul Robeson, Ethel Barrymore, and Sinclair Lewis.

At the height of his popularity, Barton enjoyed not only the acquaintance of the famous, but a solid and impressive income. All of this concealed a terribly unhappy life. He was beset by manic-depressive disorder, and each of his four marriages ended in divorce. (One of his wives was the French composer Germaine Tailleferre (1892–1983) who was a member of Les Six.) A self-portrait, painted around 1925 and modeled on an El Greco, shows a drawn and unhappy figure. A year later he wrote, "The human soul would be a hideous object if it were possible to lay it bare."

Death
On May 19, 1931, in his East Midtown Manhattan penthouse apartment, Barton shot himself through the right temple. He was 39 years old. His suicide note said he had irrevocably "lost the only woman I ever loved" (the actress Carlotta Monterey had divorced Barton in 1926 and married Eugene O'Neill in 1929), and that he feared his worsening manic-depression was approaching insanity.  He wrote: "I have had few difficulties, many friends, great successes; I have gone from wife to wife and house to house, visited great countries of the world—but I am fed up with inventing devices to fill up twenty-four hours of the day." Almost immediately, his reputation dropped from sight; several years after his death, a caricature of George Gershwin sold for a mere $5. Ralph Barton's ashes were returned to his native Kansas City and interred in Mount Moriah Cemetery.

Legacy
Toward the end of the century, his work was included in several exhibitions at the National Portrait Gallery. A 1998 conference on cartooning at the Library of Congress also considered his work.

Bibliography

Books 

 Exhibition catalog.

Essays and reporting

Critical studies and reviews of Barton's work
Bruce Kellner. The Last Dandy: Ralph Barton, American Artist, 1891-1931. Columbia: University of Missouri Press, 1991. 
John Updike. Just Looking: Essays on Art, Alfred A. Knopf, New York, 1989.

References

External links
 
 
 
Exhibition of Drawings for Contes Drolatiques of Balzac, an exhibition catalog available from the Metropolitan Museum of Art Libraries, containing descriptive information about the artworks.

American cartoonists
American caricaturists
American comics artists
Artists who committed suicide
The New Yorker cartoonists
People with bipolar disorder
Suicides by firearm in New York City
1891 births
1931 deaths
Artists from Kansas City, Missouri
1931 suicides